The 1980 Israel Super Cup was the tenth Israel Super Cup (15th, including unofficial matches, as the competition wasn't played within the Israel Football Association in its first 5 editions, until 1969), an annual Israel football match played between the winners of the previous season's Top Division and Israel State Cup. 

The match was played between Maccabi Netanya, champions of the 1979–80 Liga Leumit and Hapoel Kfar Saba, winners of the 1979–80 Israel State Cup.

This was Maccabi Netanya's 4th Israel Super Cup appearance and Hapoel Kfar Saba's second. At the match, played at Kfar Saba, Maccabi Netanya won 2–1.

Match details

References

1980
Super Cup
Super Cup 1980
Super Cup 1980
Israel Super Cup matches